Walter Melville French (January 1874 – September 13, 1930) was an American attorney who served as a Washington State Supreme Court Justice from 1927 to 1930.

Biography
Walter French was born in Branch, Michigan, to Ezekial Inman French, a produce dealer, and Martha Mattie Mitchell. In 1896, French graduated from Hillsdale College  and, in 1901, the inaugural class of the University of Washington School of Law (along with classmates Walter B. Beals and Vivian Carkeek).

After graduation, French lived in Seattle and practiced law in the firm of Allen & French. By 1910, he resided on Bainbridge Island, Kitsap County. In 1912, French was elected to the Kitsap County Superior Court.

In 1918, he ran for the Supreme Court against an incumbent, but lost. In November 1926, French, now residing in Tacoma, won election to the Supreme Court. He served three years, until his death on September 13, 1930.

On April 12, 1904, he married Bessie Westlake Carkeek (born January 16, 1879-died February 15, 1967), a cousin of his classmate Vivian Carkeek.

References

1874 births
1930 deaths
Hillsdale College alumni
University of Washington School of Law alumni
Justices of the Washington Supreme Court
20th-century American judges
20th-century American lawyers
People from Bainbridge Island, Washington
Lawyers from Seattle